Roots Of Evil is the second solo album by Mafioso rap artist Kool G Rap, released in 1998 by Kool G's record label, Illstreet. It boasts two singles, "Foul Cats" and "Can't Stop the Shine," and reached #43 on the Top R&B/Hip-Hop Albums chart. The album contains the first recorded appearance of Papoose.

Production
The album was recorded in Arizona, during a period of time where G. Rap was purposely avoiding New York.

Critical reception
Complex wrote that "G. Rap's rhymes are so richly detailed that they put you right there in the heart of the action."

Track listing

Samples 
"Cannon Fire"
"Ballad for the Fallen Soldier" by The Isley Brothers
"Can't Stop The Shine"
"What Cha Gonna Do With My Lovin'" by Stephanie Mills
"Da Bosses Lady"
"He's the Greatest Dancer" by Sister Sledge
"Foul Cats"
"Poor Abbey Walsh" by Marvin Gaye
"Hitman's Diary"
"You Light Up My Life" by Jean Carne
"Let The Games Begin"
"Have Mercy on Me" by The East St. Louis Gospelettes
"Mobsta's"
"Ain't No Sunshine" by Tom Jones
"A Thug's Love Story (Chapter I, II, III)"
"Mellow Mood (Part I)" by Barry White

Album singles

Charts

References 

Kool G Rap albums
1998 albums
Gangsta rap albums by American artists
Mafioso rap albums